Imāmzādeh Ja‘far is a  historical mausoleum in Borujerd,  western Iran. The tomb contains the remains of Abulqāsim Ja’far ibn al-Husayn, grandson of the Shī‘ah Imam Ali ibn Hussayn.

History
Built in the 11th century AD, Imamzadeh Jafar is one of the few examples of the architecture of the Seljuq and Ilkhanid eras in Iran.  A very similar mausoleum is the Tomb of Daniel in Susa, south western Iran. The building is octagonal with a high dome in the center. The height of the conic-shaped dome is 25 meters from the base. The main entrance is on the east side and there are two halls decorated with tile work from the Safavid (16th century) and Qajar (19th century) times. The doors and the fringes are decorated by Safavid era intricate decorations. The interior decoration of the building has changed during different times and lastly, it has been covered with millions of small mirrors.

The main gate is made of wood, with engraved decorations from Safavid era. 

This shrine is located in the middle of a historical graveyard with many old graves and trees. 30 meters far from the main building there is another historical tomb, known as Do Khāharān ("The Two Sisters") which belongs to two saints.

The March 2006 Borujerd earthquake caused extensive damage to the tomb. The mud-brick parts of the building were damaged and a hole appeared on the dome.

Gallery

See also
 
 Holiest sites in Islam (Shia)
 Imām Ridhā Mosque
 Shāh Abdol Azīm Mosque

References
 Borujerd Information Portal
 CHN Press
 Mehr News 2006/04/03

Shia shrines
Ziyarat
Mosques in Iran
Buildings and structures in Lorestan Province
Borujerd